Vigevano is a town and comune in the province of Pavia, Lombardy in northern Italy. A historic art town, it is also renowned for shoemaking and is one of the main centres of Lomellina, a rice-growing agricultural district. Vigevano received the honorary title of city with a decree of Duke Francis II Sforza on 2 February 1532. It is famed for its beautiful Renaissance "Piazza Ducale" in the centre of the town.

History
The earliest records of Vigevano date from the 10th century AD, when it was a favoured residence of the Lombard king Arduin, for the sake of the good hunting in the vicinity.

Vigevano was a Ghibelline commune, favoring the Emperor and was accordingly besieged and taken by the Milanese in 1201 and again in 1275. In 1328 it finally surrendered to Azzone Visconti, and thereafter shared the political fortunes of Milan. The Church of San Pietro Martire (St Peter Martyr) was built, with the adjacent Dominican convent, by Filippo Maria Visconti in 1445. In the last years of Visconti domination it sustained a siege by Francesco Sforza. Once he was settled in power in Lombardy, Sforza arranged for Vigevano to be set up as the seat of a bishop and provided its revenues.

Main sights

Castello Sforzesco

Vigevano is crowned by the Castello Sforzesco, a stronghold rebuilt 1492–94 for Ludovico Maria Sforza (Ludovico il Moro), the great patron born in the town, who transformed the fortification/hunting lodge of Luchino Visconti (who in turn had re-used a Lombard fortress) into a rich noble residence, at the cusp of Gothic and Renaissance. Leonardo da Vinci was his guest at Vigevano, as was Bramante, who is ascribed with the tall tower that watches over the piazza from the Castello Sforzesco. The old castle has a unique raised covered road, high enough for horsemen to ride through, that communicates between the new palace and the old fortifications; there is a Falconry, an elegant loggiato supported by 48 columns, and, in the rear area of the mastio, the Ladies' Loggia made for Duchess Beatrice d'Este.

Piazza Ducale
Vigevano's main attraction is the Piazza Ducale, an elongated rectangle that is almost in the proportions 1:3,  built for Ludovico Sforza, starting in 1492-93 and completed in record time, unusual for early Renaissance town planning. Piazza Ducale was actually planned to form a noble forecourt to his castle, unified by the arcades that completely surround the square, an amenity of the new North Italian towns built in the 13th century. The town's main street enters through a sham arcaded façade that preserves the unity of the space as at the Place des Vosges. Ludovico demolished the former palazzo of the commune of Vigevano to create the space.

At the outside of town is the La Sforzesca, a rectangular villa-fortress with corner palace-towers, built in 1486 by Ludovico il Moro.

Cathedral

In the 17th century one end of the Piazza Ducale was enclosed by the concave Baroque façade of the cathedral, cleverly adjusted to bring the ancient duomo into a line perpendicular to the axis of the piazza and centered on it.

The cathedral was begun in 1532 under Duke Francesco II, who commissioned the design to Antonio da Lonate. The edifice was completed in 1606. The interior is on the Latin cross plan, with a nave and two aisles, and houses works by Macrino d'Alba, Bernardino Ferrari and others, as well as tempera polyptych of the school of Leonardo da Vinci.

Economy
For centuries, the city was a manufacturing centre, especially for the silk and cotton industry.

The key sector of Vigevano industry is shoemaking. Handily shoemaking began to expand during the First World War and, by the 1950s, Vigevano was known as Italy's "shoe capital".

People
 Guido da Vigevano (c. 1280–c. 1349), physician and inventor.
 Abramo Ardizzi (de Arditiis or Ardiciis) (15th century), diplomat, ambassador, bishop, cardinal.
 Donato Bramante (1444-1514), architect and painter, worked in Vigevano for Ludovico Sforza.
 Ludovico Sforza (1452–1508), Duke of Milan.
 Leonardo da Vinci (1452-1519), polymath, worked in Vigevano for Ludovico Sforza.
 Juan Caramuel y Lobkowitz (1606-1682), mathematician and bishop of Vigevano.
 Giovanni Peroni, industrialist, who founded Peroni Brewery in Vigevano, in 1846.
 Eleonora Duse (1858–1924), Italian actress, often known simply as Duse, was born in Vigevano.
 Vito Pallavicini (1924–2007), lyricist, mostly known for being one of the two writers of "Azzurro".
 Guido Ferracin (1926–1973), athlete, European bantam weight boxing champion.
 Gian Carlo Rota (1932–1999), mathematician and philosopher, was born in Vigevano.
 Margie Santimaria (born 1989), a professional triathlete.
Carlo Erba (1811-1888), founder of Carlo Erba Spa (merged with Farmitalia)

Twin towns
 Ficarra, Italy
 Matera, Italy
 Wenzhou, People's Republic of China

Notes and references

External links

 Photo gallery made by a UNESCO photographer
 Vigevano – the ideal place for your Italian wedding

 
Castles in Italy